Inevitable is an EP by Thud, released in 1993 by Fifth Colvmn Records. In September 2018 the songs "Conflict" and "Search" received airplay on WMUC-FM when Gary Young of The Drooling Zoomers DJed them on his scheduled program The Irrelevant Show, which plays classic west-coast songs from the 1990s.

Track listing

Personnel
Adapted from the Inevitable liner notes.

Thud
 Robert Dotolo – lead vocals, guitar, production, mixing
 Gregg Hudson – drums, production
 Chris Rasley – bass guitar, production
 Adam Rutland – guitar, production

Production and design
 Craig Albertson – photography
 Julie Horowitz – cover art, photography
 Nikolas H. Huffman – cover art, design
 Larry Packer – producer, engineering

Release history

References

External links
 Inevitable at Discogs (list of releases)

1993 EPs
Thud (band) albums
Fifth Colvmn Records EPs